Charles Golding Barrett (5 May 1836, Colyton, Devon – 11 December 1904, London) was an English entomologist who specialised in Lepidoptera. He wrote The Lepidoptera of the British Islands: A Descriptive Account of the Families, Genera, and Species Indigenous to Great Britain and Ireland, Their Preparatory States, Habits, and Localities. London: L. Reeve, 1893–1907. 
 
Golding Barrett was responsible for the naming of two new genera of moths.

References
Anonym 1905: [Barrett, C. G.] The Entomologist's Record and Journal of Variation 17 26 
Anonym 1905: Barrett, C. G. Entomologist 38:32.
Salmon, M. A. 2000: The Aurelian Legacy: British Butterflies and their Collectors. Martins, Great Horkesley: Harley Books: 1-432 171-172, Portr.

Notes 

English lepidopterists
1836 births
1904 deaths